Degeneria halosauri is a species of trematodes belonging to the family Gorgoderidae. It is the only species in the monotypic genus Degeneria.

The species inhabits marine environment.

The species was originally described as Distomum halosauri in 1887 by Bell.

References

Trematoda